Konzo people may refer to:
 Konso people, an ethnic group in south-central Ethiopia
 Konjo people, a people found in the Rwenzori Mountains of Uganda